Michael O'Halloran is a 1915 novel by the American writer Gene Stratton-Porter.

Film adaptations
It has been turned into films on three occasions:
 Michael O'Halloran (1923 film), a silent film
 Michael O'Halloran (1937 film), a sound film
 Michael O'Halloran (1948 film), a sound film

References

Bibliography
 Taves, Brian. Thomas Ince: Hollywood's Independent Pioneer. University Press of Kentucky, 2012.

1915 American novels
American novels adapted into films
Novels by Gene Stratton-Porter